The 2017  Grand Prix SAR La Princesse Lalla Meryem was a women's professional tennis tournament played on clay courts. It was the 17th edition of the tournament and part of the WTA International tournaments category of the 2017 WTA Tour. It took place in Rabat, Morocco, between 1 and 6 May 2017.

Point distribution

Singles main draw entrants

Seeds 

 1 Rankings as of April 24, 2017

Other entrants 
The following players received wildcards into the singles main draw:
  Anna Blinkova
  Lina Qostal
  Francesca Schiavone 

The following players received entry as qualifiers:
  Gabriela Dabrowski 
  Aleksandra Krunić 
  Conny Perrin
  Nadia Podoroska

The following player received entry as a Lucky Loser:
  Sílvia Soler Espinosa

Withdrawals 
Before the tournament
  Caroline Garcia → replaced by  Andrea Petkovic
  Peng Shuai → replaced by  Sara Errani
  Shelby Rogers → replaced by  Maryna Zanevska
  Anastasija Sevastova → replaced by  Tatjana Maria
  Laura Siegemund → replaced by  Sílvia Soler Espinosa

Doubles main draw entrants

Seeds 

 1 Rankings as of April 24, 2017

Other entrants 
The following pairs received wildcards into the doubles main draw:
  Abir Elfahimi /  Lilya Hadab
  Laura Pous Tió /  Lina Qostal

Champions

Singles 

  Anastasia Pavlyuchenkova def.  Francesca Schiavone 7–5, 7–5

Doubles 

  Tímea Babos /  Andrea Hlaváčková def.  Nina Stojanović /  Maryna Zanevska 2–6, 6–3, [10–5]

References

External links 
 Official website

Morocco Open
Grand Prix SAR La Princesse Lalla Meryem
Morocco